The 1983–84 season was Sport Lisboa e Benfica's 80th season in existence and the club's 50th consecutive season in the top flight of Portuguese football, covering the period from 1 July 1983 to 30 June 1984. Benfica competed domestically in the Primeira Divisão, Taça de Portugal and the Supertaça Cândido de Oliveira, and participated in the European Cup after winning the previous league. They also played in the Iberian Cup with the La Liga winners, Athletic Bilbao.

In the second year of Eriksson at Benfica, he lost João Alves and Frederico Rosa but hired António Oliveira and Michael Manniche. Benfica started the season by winning the Portuguese Cup Final of the past season and the Iberian Cup. In the league, Benfica started strong until their drop points in October. A home win against Porto propelled them into first place, which they never lost. Twelve consecutive wins followed until they were stopped in February. In March, Benfica was knocked out of Europe and lost for the first time in the league. They reacted with five wins and a draw in the next month, before losing for a second time in late April. In May, Benfica confirmed their 26th league title, as Eriksson departed the club in June.

Season summary
Benfica entered the new season having won the league, and reached the Portuguese Cup Final and the UEFA Cup Final. 
Due to conflict between Porto and the Portuguese Football Federation, the final for the Taça de Portugal did not take place and was postponed. During the transfer window, Benfica lost João Alves and Frederico Rosa, who opted not to renew their contracts. New signings included centre-back, António Oliveira and striker, Michael Manniche. The latter replaced Cláudio Adão, who stayed just one month in the club. The pre-season began on 17 July, with medical tests, followed by roughly two weeks of training sessions. Benfica made their presentation game to the fans on 31 July with Coventry City, and competed in North America, with Tecos and Toronto Blizzard. The pre-season closed with the Lisbon International Tournament, which they won. On 10 August, it was confirmed that the Portuguese Cup Final of the past season would be played on the 21, at Estádio das Antas.  The first official game was the 
Iberian Cup with the La Liga winners, Athletic Bilbao. In a competition sponsored by the Portuguese Football Federation and the Royal Spanish Football Federation, that joined the Primeira Divisão and La Liga Champions in a two-legged Super cup.

Benfica first visited the San Mamés Stadium on the 17, losing 2–1. A week later, they received Bilbao at home and won by 3–1, thus keeping the trophy. Between that, Benfica played the Portuguese Cup Final with Porto, winning one-nil with a goal from Carlos Manuel. The league campaign started in the best of terms, with four consecutive wins, while in the European Cup, Benfica eliminated Linfield in the first round. In October, they dropped the first points, in a draw with Braga, which left the club in second, a point shy of the leader Porto, their next opponent. In the Clássico, Benfica beat his rival Porto and assumed first place. Later in the month, Benfica defeated Olympiacos in the second round of the European Cup, qualifying for the quarter-final. In November and December, Benfica won all their league matches, but lost the Supertaça Cândido de Oliveira to Porto.

Benfica kept on winning in the Primeira Divisão in January, lapping the first part of league with a three-point lead. However they suffered a set-back in the Taça de Portugal, losing 2–1 in Estádio de Alvalade being eliminated by Sporting. In February, Benfica lost points again in the league after twelve consecutive wins. March was even more troublesome because the team was knocked-out of the European Cup by Liverpool, while in the league, Porto gave them their first league loss all season. Still, in the following month, Benfica won five games and draw one, allowing them to keep the three point lead over Porto. On 29 April, Benfica unexpectedly lost 4–1 with Vitória de Guimarães. The loss did not cause major damage because Porto had also lost points, so the distance was only cut to two points. The very next match-day, the Derby de Lisboa with Sporting, Benfica drew one-all but still celebrated their 26th league title, due to Porto having lost on the same day. Against an opponent that broke the record for the fewest goals conceded in the history of the Primeira Divisão and had won all of their matches at home, Benfica responded with more goals scored, and a better record in away games, only losing six points there all season. Nené with 21 goals in 26 goals came in second place in the Bola de Prata, because he had played in more games, but oddly, with fewer minutes in overall. In June, Sven-Göran Eriksson announced his departure to Roma, having won back-to-back league titles in his two-year stint in Portugal.

Competitions

Overall record

Supertaça Cândido de Oliveira

Iberian Cup

Primeira Divisão

League table

Results by round

Matches

Taça de Portugal

1982–83 Edition

1983–84 Edition

European Cup

First round

Second round

Quarter-final

Friendlies

Player statistics
The squad for the season consisted of the players listed in the tables below, as well as staff member Sven-Goran Eriksson (manager), Toni (assistant manager), Eusébio (assistant manager), Júlio Borges (Director of Football), Amilcar Miranda (Doctor).

Transfers

In

Out

Out by loan

References

Bibliography
 
 
 
 

S.L. Benfica seasons
Benfica
Portuguese football championship-winning seasons